Blue & Lonesome is the 23rd British and 25th American studio album by the English rock band the Rolling Stones released on 2 December 2016. It is the band's first album to feature only cover songs, and their first studio release since 2005's A Bigger Bang, with its eleven-year gap being the longest between two albums from the band. Despite the short running of approximately 43 minutes, the album was released as a double LP. "Just Your Fool", a Buddy Johnson cover (though the Rolling Stones version is based on Little Walter's arrangement) was released as the first single from the album on 6 October. The name of the album is from a song which Little Walter wrote, "Blue and Lonesome".

Despite an 11-year gap between albums, the Rolling Stones kept the same basic production and musician team as A Bigger Bang. Joining vocalist Mick Jagger and guitarist Keith Richards as producers was Don Was, who had been working with the group for most of the prior two decades. In the studio were band members Ronnie Wood (guitar) and Charlie Watts (drums), alongside contract players Darryl Jones (bass), Chuck Leavell (keyboards) and Matt Clifford (multi-instrumentalist). Eric Clapton played guitar on two tracks and drummer Jim Keltner plays percussion on another.

The album was recorded during three sessions in December 2015 and sold well after its release a year later. It reached number one on the album charts in the UK and over a dozen other countries, and number four in the US. It was certified gold or platinum in several countries. The first Stones album of the streaming media age, many of the songs from the album charted on several top-40 digital music charts, and the lead single "Just Your Fool" was a top-40 hit on several airplay and genre-specific charts. The album received four- and five-star ratings from many music journalists, and accolades from jazz and blues publications. It was awarded the Grammy Award for Best Traditional Blues Album in 2018, the band's first Grammy in 23 years.

It was the final studio album to be released before the death of drummer Charlie Watts in 2021.

Background
Blue & Lonesome was recorded in just three days in December 2015. In April 2016, at the launch of the Rolling Stones career retrospective Exhibitionism, the band confirmed that their new album was due to be released "some time in the autumn". Richards said the album would feature "a lot of Chicago blues". Eric Clapton plays guitar on two tracks; he was recording his own album I Still Do in the same studio as the Stones were and was asked to play on a few tracks. The album is entirely blues-based, consisting of covers of artists such as Howlin' Wolf and Little Walter.

It is the first album since Dirty Work (1986) to not feature any guitar playing from Jagger (who instead concentrates completely on vocals and harmonica), although he is pictured in the album's booklet playing guitar during the album's sessions. It is also the first album since It's Only Rock 'n Roll (1974) to not feature a lead vocal from Richards. Likewise, it is also the first album since Dirty Work to release a lead single that was not a Jagger/Richards composition with "Just Your Fool".

Promotion
On 6 October 2016, the Rolling Stones changed their tongue and lips logo, which first appeared on their Sticky Fingers album, from red to blue.

On 8 November 2016, the Rolling Stones released a video for "Hate to See You Go".

On 25 November 2016, the Stones released a one-track limited edition electric blue 10" vinyl record of "Ride 'Em on Down" (on the UMC label) on the occasion of the Record Store Day Black Friday 2016. The track is a cover of Eddie Taylor's "Ride 'Em on Down" originally recorded by Taylor in Chicago on 5 December 1955 for the Vee-Jay Label (and released as VJ 185).

On 1 December 2016, they released a video for "Ride 'Em on Down". The video features actress Kristen Stewart driving through Los Angeles in a blue 1968 Ford Mustang Fastback.

Release and reception

During its first week the album moved 106,000 sales to debut at No. 1 on the UK Albums Chart, the second-highest opening sales week for an album in the UK in 2016. On 3 February 2017 it was certified Platinum, for sales over 300,000 copies. It also debuted at No. 4 on the US Billboard 200 with 123,000 album-equivalent units, of which 120,000 were pure album sales. It was also the No. 2 best selling album of the week in the US. Despite strong initial sales, the album remains to this day the only Stones' studio album without at least a gold certification for certified sales in the USA.

 Kitty Empire from The Observer called it "a labour of love", while Alexis Petridis of The Guardian said the Stones here are "more alive than they've sounded for years". Robert Christgau was less impressed in Vice, saying the album is "a sodden thing – many old rockers have recorded sharper, spunkier, wiser music". Greil Marcus was not impressed either, writing that "except for Mick Jagger everyone sounds bored."

Accolades
The album won Album of the Year at the 2017 Jazz FM Awards. The Rolling Stones also won the Blues Artist of the Year Award at the event, held in April 2017.

On January 28, 2018, Blue & Lonesome received a Grammy Award for Best Traditional Blues Album of the Year at the 60th Annual Grammy Awards. The award was the Stones' third Grammy of their career and their first win since the 1995 show.

Track listing

Personnel
Adapted from AllMusic.

The Rolling Stones
 Mick Jagger – lead vocals, harmonica
 Keith Richards – electric guitar
 Ronnie Wood – electric guitar
 Charlie Watts – drums

Additional musicians
 Darryl Jones – bass guitar
 Chuck Leavell – keyboards
 Eric Clapton – slide guitar on "Everybody Knows About My Good Thing", lead electric guitar on "I Can't Quit You Baby"
 Matt Clifford – Wurlitzer piano, keyboards, Hammond B3
 Jim Keltner – percussion on "Hoo Doo Blues"

Production and design
 Andy Cook – assistant engineer
 Jason Elliott – assistant engineer
 The Glimmer Twins – producer
 Richard Havers – liner notes
 Stephen Marcussen – mastering
 Ron McMaster – mastering
 Krish Sharma – engineer, mixer
 Pierre de Beauport – crew chief 
 Don McAulay – drum technician
 Anna Donarski - guitar technician
 Derrick Stockwell – assistant engineer
 Don Was – producer
 Studio Fury – sleeve design and art direction

Charts

Weekly charts

Year-end charts

Certifications

References

External links
 
 
 

2016 albums
Albums produced by Don Was
Albums produced by the Glimmer Twins
Covers albums
Polydor Records albums
The Rolling Stones albums